Đồng Văn is a rural district of Hà Giang province in the Northeast region of Vietnam. As of 2019, the district had a population of 81 880. The district covers an area of 447 km2. The district capital lies at Đồng Văn.

Administrative divisions
Đồng Văn District consists of two townships, Đồng Văn and Phố Bảng, and the communes of Hố Quáng Phìn, Lũng Cú, Lũng Phìn, Lũng Táo, Lũng Thầu, Má Lé, Phố Cáo, Phố Là, Sà Phìn, Sảng Tủng, Sính Lủng, Sủng Là, Sủng Trái, Tả Lủng, Tả Phìn, Thài Phìn Tủng and Vần Chải.

See also
Dong Van Karst Plateau Geopark
Đồng Văn riot

References

Districts of Hà Giang province
Hà Giang province